The FIBA Korać Cup was an annual basketball club competition held by FIBA between the 1971–72 and 2001–02 seasons. It was the third-tier level club competition in European basketball, after the FIBA European Champions' Cup (later renamed the EuroLeague) and the FIBA Cup Winners' Cup (later renamed the FIBA Saporta Cup). The last Korać Cup season was held during the 2001–02 season.

History
The Korać Cup was named after the legendary Yugoslav player Radivoj Korać, killed in 1969 in a car accident near Sarajevo. The Korać Cup is not to be confused with the Serbian national basketball cup competition, the Radivoj Korać Cup, which has been named after Radivoj Korać since the mid-2000s, the next year after the international Korać Cup competition was terminated. Following the 2011 agreement between FIBA Europe and the Basketball Federation of Serbia, the actual winners' trophy given out for 30 years in the Korać Cup (the so-called "Žućko's left") will, from 2012 onwards, be given to the winning team of the Serbian national cup competition.

Finals

Titles by club

Titles by nation

Winning rosters

 1972  Lokomotiva
Nikola Plećaš, Damir Rukavina, Vječeslav Kavedžija, Rajko Gospodnetić, Milivoj Omašić, Eduard Bočkaj, Ivica Valek, Dragan Kovačić, Petar Jelić, Ante Ercegović, Zdenko Grgić, Srećko Šute, Zvonko Avberšek (Head Coach: Marijan Catinelli)

 1973  Birra Forst Cantù
Pierlo Marzorati, Bob Lienhard, Carlo Recalcati, Antonio Farina, Mario Beretta, Fabrizio Della Fiori, Luciano Vendemini, Franco Meneghel, Renzo Tombolato, Giorgio Cattini, Danilo Zonta (Head Coach: Arnaldo Taurisano)

 1973–74  Birra Forst Cantù
Pierlo Marzorati, Bob Lienhard, Carlo Recalcati, Fabrizio Della Fiori, Antonio Farina, Franco Meneghel, Mario Beretta, Renzo Tombolato, Giorgio Cattini, Luciano Vendemini, Danilo Zonta (Head Coach: Arnaldo Taurisano)

 1974–75  Birra Forst Cantù
Bob Lienhard, Pierlo Marzorati, Fabrizio Della Fiori, Carlo Recalcati, Antonio Farina, Franco Meneghel, Mario Beretta, Renzo Tombolato, Giorgio Cattini, Silvano Cancian (Head Coach: Arnaldo Taurisano)

 1975–76  Jugoplastika
Željko Jerkov, Rato Tvrdić, Duje Krstulović, Mirko Grgin, Mlađan Tudor, Branko Macura, Ivo Bilanović, Ivica Skaric, Damir Šolman, Branislav Stamenković, Ivica Dukan, Mihajlo Manović, Drago Peterka, Slobodan Bjelajac (Head Coach: Petar Skansi)

 1976–77  Jugoplastika
Željko Jerkov, Rato Tvrdić, Damir Šolman, Duje Krstulović, Mlađan Tudor, Mirko Grgin, Mihajlo Manović, Ivo Bilanović, Branko Macura, Ivica Dukan, Slobodan Bjelajac, Predrag Kruščić (Head Coach: Petar Skansi)

 1977–78  Partizan
Dragan Kićanović, Dražen Dalipagić, Miodrag Marić, Jadran Vujačić, Boban Petrović, Dragan Todorić, Dušan Kerkez, Boris Beravs, Milenko Babić, Milan Medić, Arsenije Pešić, Zoran Krečković, Dragan Đukić  (Head Coach: Ranko Žeravica)

 1978–79  Partizan
Dragan Kićanović, Miodrag Marić, Boban Petrović, Arsenije Pešić, Dragan Todorić, Jadran Vujačić, Dušan Kerkez, Boris Beravs, Goran Knežević, Milenko Savović, Milenko Babić, Milan Medić, Predrag Bojić, Miroslav Milojević (Head Coach: Dušan Ivković)

 1979–80  Arrigoni Rieti
Roberto Brunamonti, Lee Johnson, Willie Sojourner, Giuseppe Danzi, Alberto Scodavolpe, Gianfranco Sanesi, Antonio Olivieri, Luca Blasetti, Mauro Antonelli, Stefano Colantoni, Paolo di Fazi, Antonio Coppola (Head Coach: Elio Pentassuglia)

 1980–81  Joventut Freixenet
Al Skinner, Luis Miguel Santillana, Josep Maria Margall, Gonzalo Sagi-Vela, Joe Galvin, Ernesto Delgado, German Gonzalez, Jordi Villacampa, Francisco Sole, Roberto Mora, Antonio Pruna (Head Coach: Manel Comas)

 1981–82  Limoges CSP
Ed Murphy, Richard Dacoury, Jean-Michel Sénégal, Irv Kiffin, Apollo Faye, Jean-Luc Deganis, Yves-Marie Verove, Didier Rose, Richard Billet, Philippe Koundrioukoff, Eric Narbonne, Benoit Tremouille (Head Coach: André Buffière)

 1982–83  Limoges CSP
Ed Murphy, Richard Dacoury, Jean-Michel Sénégal, Glenn Mosley, Apollo Faye, Jean-Luc Deganis, Hugues Occansey, Didier Dobbels, Didier Rose, Eric Narbonne, Mathieu Faye, Olivier Garry (Head Coach: André Buffière)

 1983–84  Orthez
Paul Henderson, John McCullough, Bengaly Kaba, Mathieu Bisseni, Freddy Hufnagel, Christian Ortega, Philippe Laperche, Pascal Laperche, Didier Gadou, Alain Gadou (Head Coach: George Fisher)

 1984–85  Simac Milano
Mike D'Antoni, Dino Meneghin, Russ Schoene, Roberto Premier, Joe Barry Carroll, Renzo Bariviera, Franco Boselli, Mario Pettorossi, Vittorio Gallinari, Tullio De Piccoli, Marco Lamperti, Mario Governa, Marco Baldi (Head Coach: Dan Peterson)

 1985–86  Banco di Roma
Leo Rautins, Bruce Flowers, Enrico Gilardi, Marco Solfrini, Stefano Sbarra, Fulvio Polesello, Franco Rossi, Phil Melillo, Fabrizio Valente, Claudio Brunetti, Gianluca Duri, Franco Picozzi (Head Coach: Mario de Sisti)

 1986–87  FC Barcelona
Juan Antonio San Epifanio, Chicho Sibilio, Wallace Bryant, Ignacio Solozabal, Andrés Jiménez, Steve Trumbo, Juan Domingo De la Cruz, Quim Costa, Jordi Soler, Julian Ortiz, Ferran Martínez, Kenny Simpson (Head Coach: Aíto García Reneses)

 1987–88  Real Madrid
Wendell Alexis, Fernando Martín, Brad Branson, Fernando Romay, Juan Antonio Corbalán, José Biriukov, José Luis Llorente, Juan Manuel López Iturriaga, Pep Cargol, Antonio Martín, Alfonso Del Corral (Head Coach: Lolo Sainz)

 1988–89  Partizan
Vlade Divac, Aleksandar Đorđević, Predrag Danilović, Žarko Paspalj, Ivo Nakić, Željko Obradović, Oliver Popović, Milenko Savović, Jadran Vujačić, Miladin Mutavdžić, Boris Orcev, Predrag Prlinčević, Dejan Lakićević, Vladimir Bosanac (Head Coach: Dušan Vujošević)

 1989–90  Ram Joventut
Jordi Villacampa, Lemone Lampley, Reggie Johnson, Juan Antonio Morales, Jose Antonio Montero, Rafael Jofresa, Tomás Jofresa, Carlos Ruf, Josep Maria Margall, Dani Pérez, Antonio Medianero, Pere Remon, Ferran Lopez, Robert Bellavista (Head Coach: Herb Brown / Pedro Martínez)

 1990–91  Shampoo Clear Cantù
Pace Mannion, Pierlo Marzorati, Davide Pessina, Giuseppe Bosa, Roosevelt Bouie, Alberto Rossini, Angelo Gilardi, Andrea Gianolla, Silvano Dal Seno, Omar Tagliabue, Alessandro Zorzolo, Fabio Gatti (Head Coach: Fabrizio Frates)

 1991–92  Il Messaggero Roma
Dino Rađa, Rick Mahorn, Roberto Premier, Andrea Niccolai, Alessandro Fantozzi, Donato Avenia, Stefano Attruia, Fausto Bargna, Davide Croce, Gianluca Lulli (Head Coach: Paolo di Fonzo)

 1992–93  Philips Milano
Aleksandar Đorđević, Antonello Riva, Antonio Davis, Riccardo Pittis, Flavio Portaluppi, Davide Pessina, Fabrizio Ambrassa, Paolo Alberti, Marco Baldi, Marco Sambugaro, Massimo Re (Head Coach: Mike D'Antoni)

 1993–94  PAOK Bravo
Walter Berry, Zoran Savić, Branislav Prelević, John Korfas, Nasos Galakteros, Nikos Boudouris, Achilleas Mamatziolas, George Ballogiannis, Christos Tsekos, Efthimis Rentzias, Georgios Valavanidis, Fotis Takianos (Head Coach: Soulis Markopoulos)

 1994–95  Alba Berlin
Teoman Alibegović, Saša Obradović, Gunther Behnke, Henrik Rödl, Ingo Freyer, Ademola Okulaja, Stephan Baeck, Teoman Öztürk, Sebastian Machowski, Patrick Falk, Oliver Braun (Head Coach: Svetislav Pešić)

 1995–96  Efes Pilsen
Petar Naumoski, Conrad McRae, Ufuk Sarıca, Mirsad Türkcan, Volkan Aydın, Tamer Oyguç, Murat Evliyaoğlu, Hüseyin Beşok, Bora Sancar, Mustafa Kemal Bitim, Alpay Öztaş, Erdal Bibo (Head Coach: Aydın Örs)

 1996–97  Aris
José "Piculín" Ortiz, Charles Shackleford, Mario Boni, Panagiotis Liadelis, Dinos Angelidis, Mike Nahar, Alan Tomidy, Tzanis Stavrakopoulos, Giannis Sioutis, Georgios Floros, Alexis Papadatos, Aris Holopoulos (Head Coach: Slobodan-Lefteris Subotić)

 1997–98  Mash Jeans Verona
Mike Iuzzolino, Hansi Gnad, Randolph Keys, Myron Brown, Roberto Dalla Vecchia, Roberto Bullara, Joachim Jerichow, Alessandro Boni, Matteo Nobile, Giampiero Savio, Damiano Dalfini, Davide Tisato, Matteo Sacchetti, Mario Soave, Massimo Spezie (Head Coach: Andrea Mazzon)

 1998–99  FC Barcelona
Aleksandar Đorđević, Derrick Alston, Milan Gurović, Efthimis Rentzias, Roger Esteller, Rodrigo De la Fuente, Roberto Dueñas, Xavi Fernandez, Ignacio Rodríguez, Alfons Alzamora, Oriol Junyent, Juan Carlos Navarro, Chema Marcos (Head Coach: Aíto García Reneses)

 1999–00  Limoges CSP
Marcus Brown, Yann Bonato, Harper Williams, Frédéric Weis, Bruno Hamm, Thierry Rupert, Stéphane Dumas, David Frigout, Stjepan Stazic, Jean-Philippe Methelie, Carl Thomas, Frédéric Adjiwanou (Head Coach: Duško Ivanović)

 2000–01  Unicaja
Danya Abrams, Veljko Mršić, Moustapha Sonko, Richard Petruška, Jean-Marc Jaumin, Paco Vazquez, Berni Rodríguez, Frédéric Weis, Darren Phillip, Carlos Cabezas, Kenny Miller, Germán Gabriel, Francis Perujo (Head Coach: Božidar Maljković)

 2001–02  SLUC Nancy
Stevin Smith, Cyril Julian, Ross Land, Fabien Dubos, Goran Bošković, Joseph Gomis, Vincent Masingue, Maxime Zianveni, Mouhamadou Mbodji, Danilo Cmiljanić, Gary Phaeton, Loic Toilier (Head Coach: Sylvain Lautie)

Korać Cup Finals Top Scorers 
From the 1972 to 2001–02 seasons, the Top Scorer of the Korać Cup finals was noted, regardless of whether he played on the winning or losing team.

Top scoring performances in final games
 Dražen Dalipagić (Partizan) 48 points vs. Bosna (in 1977–78 final)
 Dražen Petrović (Cibona) 47 points vs. Real Madrid (in second leg of 1987–88 final)
 Dragan Kićanović (Partizan) 41 points vs. Arrigoni Rieti (in 1978–79 final)
 Nikola Plećaš (Lokomotiva) 40 points vs. OKK Beograd (in second leg of 1971–72 final)
 Sasha Djordjević (Philips Milano) 38 points vs. Virtus Roma (in second leg of 1992–93 final)
 Antonello Riva (Wiwa Vismara Cantù) 36 points vs. Partizan (in second leg of 1988–89 final)
 Pace Mannion (Shampoo Clear Cantù) 35 points vs. Real Madrid (in second leg of 1990–91 final)
 Ed Murphy (Limoges CSP) 35 points vs. Šibenka (in 1981–82 final)
 Ed Murphy (Limoges CSP) 34 points vs. Šibenka (in 1982–83 final)
 Željko Jerkov (Jugoplastika) 34 points vs. Alco Bologna (in 1976–77 final)
 Dino Rađa (Il Messaggero Roma) 34 points vs. Scavolini Pesaro (in first leg of 1991–92 final)
 Saša Obradović (Alba Berlin) 34 points vs. Stefanel Milano (in first leg of 1994–95 final)
 Teoman Alibegović (Alba Berlin) 34 points vs. Stefanel Milano (in second leg of 1994–95 final)

Notes
 Coach Bogdan Tanjević made it to 5 Korać Cup finals with four different clubs, and lost all of them. In 1978 his Bosna team lost to Partizan 110–117 in overtime. Then in 1986 he made it to the very end again with Mobilgirgi Caserta, only to lose to Banco di Roma in a two legged final. Finally, in the '90s, Tanjević made 3 more finals, this time consecutively: with Stefanel Trieste in 1994 (lost to PAOK Bravo), and with Stefanel Milano in 1995 and 1996 (lost to Alba Berlin and Efes Pilsen, respectively).

See also
Rosters of the top basketball teams in European club competitions

References

External links
 FIBA Korać Cup @ FIBA Europe.com
 Winners of FIBA Korać Cup (from 1971-72 to 2001-02) 

 
Defunct basketball cup competitions in Europe
International club basketball competitions
Recurring sporting events established in 1971
1971 establishments in Europe
2002 disestablishments in Europe
Recurring sporting events disestablished in 2002